McGowan Ministry may refer to these ministries in Western Australia:

First McGowan Ministry: 2017–2021
Second McGowan Ministry: 2021present

For the ministry in New South Wales
McGowen ministry: 1910–1913